The Martin Nunataks are a pair of isolated nunataks situated along the northern margin of David Glacier,  southeast of Mount Wood, in Victoria Land, Antarctica. They were mapped by the United States Geological Survey (USGS) from surveys and U.S. Navy air photos, 1956–62, and were named by the Advisory Committee on Antarctic Names for Robert D. Martin, a USGS topographic engineer at McMurdo Station, 1961–62.

References

Nunataks of Oates Land